Carl Edward Vine,  (born 8 October 1954) is an Australian composer of contemporary classical music.

From 1975 he has worked as a freelance pianist and composer with a variety of theatre and dance companies, and ensembles. Vine's catalogue includes eight symphonies, twelve concertos, music for film, television and theatre, electronic music and numerous chamber works. From 2000 until 2019 Carl was the Artistic Director of Musica Viva Australia. Within that role he was also Artistic Director of the Huntington Estate Music Festival from 2006, and of the Musica Viva Festival (Sydney) from 2008. In 2005 he was awarded the Don Banks Music Award. In the 2014 Queen's Birthday Honours List, Vine was appointed as an Officer of the Order of Australia (AO), "for distinguished service to the performing arts as a composer, conductor, academic and artistic director, and to the support and mentoring of emerging performers." Vine currently lectures in composition and orchestration at the Sydney Conservatorium of Music.

Career

Vine was born in Perth, Western Australia. He played the cornet from the age of 5, and took up the piano when he was 10. A teenage fascination with the music of Karlheinz Stockhausen inspired a period of Modernism, which he explored until the mid-1980s. He studied physics, then composition at the University of Western Australia (now the UWA Conservatorium of Music), before moving to Sydney in 1975, where he worked as a freelance pianist and composer with a variety of theatre and dance companies, and ensembles.

Vine first came to prominence in Australia as a composer of music for dance, with 25 dance scores to his credit. In 1979 he co-founded the contemporary music ensemble "Flederman", which presented many of Vine's own works. From 1980 to 1982 he lectured in electronic music composition at the Queensland Conservatorium of Music in Brisbane.

His catalogue includes eight symphonies, twelve concertos, music for film, television and theatre, electronic music and numerous chamber works. Although primarily a composer of modern classical music, he has undertaken tasks as diverse as arranging the Australian national anthem and writing music for the 1996 Atlanta Olympics closing ceremony.

Since 2000, Vine has been the Artistic Director of Musica Viva Australia, the world's largest chamber music presenter. In 2005, he was awarded the Don Banks Music Award, the highest accolade the Australia Council for the Arts can confer on a musician. Since 2006, he has also been the Artistic Director of the Huntington Estate Music Festival.

In 2012, his second piano concerto was premiered by Piers Lane and the Sydney Symphony Orchestra, and the Australian Chamber Orchestra with soprano Danielle de Niese premiered his solo cantata, The Tree of Man, after the 1955 novel by Patrick White.

In the 2014 Queen's Birthday Honours List, Vine was appointed as an Officer of the Order of Australia (AO), "for distinguished service to the performing arts as a composer, conductor, academic and artistic director, and to the support and mentoring of emerging performers."

Vine is based in Sydney, where he works as a freelance composer. His trombone concerto Five Hallucinations was premiered by the Chicago Symphony Orchestra in October 2016. Since 2014, Vine has also worked at the Sydney Conservatorium of Music as a senior lecturer in composition.

Works

Symphonic
Symphony No. 1 MicroSymphony (1986)
Symphony No. 2 (1988)
Symphony No. 3 (1990)
Symphony No. 4 (1992; Symphony No. 4.2, revised 1998)
Symphony No. 5 Percussion Symphony (1995)
Symphony No. 6 Choral Symphony (1996)
Symphony No. 7 Scenes from Daily Life (2008)
Symphony No. 8 The Enchanted Loom (2018)

Concertante
Percussion Concerto (1987)
Concerto Grosso (violin, flute, oboe, horn and strings) (1989)
Gaijin (koto, strings, pre-recorded electronics) (1994)
Oboe Concerto (1996)
Piano Concerto No. 1 (1997; commissioned by Sydney Symphony Orchestra)
Pipe Dreams (concerto for flute and strings) (2003)
Cello Concerto (2004)
Violin Concerto (2011)
Piano Concerto No. 2 (2012)
Concerto for Orchestra (2014)
Five Hallucinations (concerto for trombone and orchestra) (2016)
Wonders (cantata for soprano, baritone, two choirs and orchestra) (2016)
Implacable Gifts (concerto for two pianos and orchestra) (2018)

Other orchestral
The Tree of Man (2012) (cantata for soprano and string orchestra)
Gravity Road (2014) (a tone poem)

Chamber music
String Quartet No. 1 (Knips Suite) (1979)
String Quartet No. 2 (1984)
String Quartet No. 3 (1994)
String Quartet No. 4 (2004)
String Quartet No. 5 (2007)
String Quartet No. 6 (Child's Play) (2017)
String Quintet (2009)
Miniature I Peace (solo viola) (1973)
Miniature II (viola duet) (1974)
Miniature III (flute, trombone, piano, percussion) (1983)
Miniature IV (flute, clarinet, cello, violin, viola, cello, piano) (1988)
Sonata for flute and piano (1992)
Inner World (solo cello with pre-recorded electronics) (1994)
Fantasia for piano quintet (2013)
The Village for piano trio (2014)
Strutt Sonata for cello and piano (2017)
Clarinet Quintet (2022)

Piano
 Piano Sonata No. 1 (1990)
 Five Bagatelles (solo piano) (1994)
 Piano Sonata No. 2 (1997)
 Rash (piano with CD) (1997)
 Red Blues (solo piano) (1999)
 The Anne Landa Preludes (solo piano) (2006)
 Piano Sonata No. 3 (2007)
 Sonata for Piano Four Hands (2009)
 Toccatissimo (2011)
 The Arrival of Implacable Gifts (piano four hands) (2017)
 Piano Sonata No. 4 (2019)

Dance
961 Ways to Nirvana (1977)
Incident at Bull Creek (1977)
Poppy (1978)
Everymans Troth (1978)
Scene Shift (1979)
Kisses Remembered (1979)
Knips Suite (1979)
Missing Film (1980)
Return (1980)
Donna Maria Blues (1981)
Colonial Sketches (1981)
Daisy Bates (1982)
Hate (1982)
A Christmas Carol (1983)
Prologue and Canzona (1986)
Legend (1988)
On The Edge (1989)
Piano Sonata (1990)
The Tempest (1991)
Beauty and The Beast (1993)
Mythologia (2000)
The Silver Rose (2005)
Tribe's Desire (2010)

Theatre
The Dreamers (play – 1975)
New Sky (mime by Judith Anderson – 1981)
Signal Driver (play by Patrick White – 1982)
Shepherd on the Rocks (play by Patrick White – 1987)
The Ham Funeral (play by Patrick White – 1989)
The Master Builder (play by Ibsen – 1991)
Night on Bald Mountain (play by Patrick White – 1996)
A Hard God (play by Peter Kenna – 1997)

Film and television
The Dunstan Documentaries (TV) (1982)
You Can't Push the River (1993)
Bedevil (1993)
The Battlers (TV) (1994)
Urn (short film) (1995)
What Comes After Why? (short film) (1995)
White Fella's Dreaming (documentary) (1997)
Marriage Acts (TV) (2000)
The Potato Factory (TV) (2000)

Discography (partial)
 Carl Vine: The Complete Symphonies, performed by the Sydney Symphony Orchestra.
 Carl Vine – Chamber Music Volume 1
 Carl Vine – Chamber Music Volume 2
 Carl Vine: The Piano Music

Awards and prizes

ARIA Music Awards
The ARIA Music Awards is an annual awards ceremony that recognises excellence, innovation, and achievement across all genres of Australian music. They commenced in 1987. 

! 
|-
| 1994
| ''Bedevil
| Best Original Soundtrack, Cast or Show Album
| 
| 
|-

Bernard Heinze Memorial Award
The Sir Bernard Heinze Memorial Award is given to a person who has made an outstanding contribution to music in Australia.

! 
|-
| 2011 || Carl Vine || Sir Bernard Heinze Memorial Award ||  || 
|-

Don Banks Music Award
The Don Banks Music Award was established in 1984 to publicly honour a senior artist of high distinction who has made an outstanding and sustained contribution to music in Australia. It was founded by the Australia Council in honour of Don Banks, Australian composer, performer and the first chair of its music board.

|-
| 2005
| Carl Vine
| Don Banks Music Award
| 
|-

References

External links
 
 
 Interview with Carl Vine, November 1, 1988

1954 births
20th-century classical composers
21st-century classical composers
APRA Award winners
Artistic directors (music)
Australian arts administrators
Australian film score composers
Composers for piano
Living people
Male film score composers
Musicians from Perth, Western Australia
Academic staff of Queensland Conservatorium Griffith University
20th-century Australian male musicians
20th-century Australian musicians
21st-century Australian male musicians
21st-century Australian musicians
Australian classical pianists
Male classical pianists
Australian male classical composers